Ingvaldsen is a surname. Notable people with the surname include:

Bernt Ingvaldsen (1902–1985), Norwegian politician
Elisabeth Ingvaldsen, Norwegian orienteering competitor
Jan-Olav Ingvaldsen (1954–2021), Norwegian politician
Ole Ingvaldsen (born 1948), Norwegian curler an curling coach
Ole Marius Ingvaldsen (born 1985), Norwegian ski jumper